Robert Toneff (June 23, 1930 – March 15, 2015) was a National Football League defensive lineman for the San Francisco 49ers and the Washington Redskins.  He went to four Pro Bowls during his 13-year career.  Toneff played college football at the University of Notre Dame and was drafted in the second round of the 1952 NFL Draft.

References

1930 births
2015 deaths
American football defensive linemen
Notre Dame Fighting Irish football players
San Francisco 49ers players
Washington Redskins players
Western Conference Pro Bowl players
Eastern Conference Pro Bowl players